"Perfect Fit" is a 1995 song by Van Morrison.

Perfect Fit may also refer to:
"Perfect Fit", a song by AFI from Very Proud of Ya, 1996
"Perfect Fit", a song by Gwyneth Herbert from Clangers and Mash, 2009
Perfect Fit, a 1990 NES game by Fisher-Price

See also
A Perfect Fit (disambiguation)